Star Wars Journal: Hero for Hire is a 1998 young adult novel by science fiction author Donna Tauscher. The novel recounts the events of the film Star Wars Episode IV: A New Hope (1977) from the point of view of one of its main characters, Han Solo.

The book is published by Scholastic and part of the Star Wars Journal Series. Other titles in the series are Star Wars Journal: Captive to Evil (1998) by Jude Watson, Star Wars Journal: The Fight for Justice (1998) by John Peel, Star Wars Episode I Journal: Queen Amidala (1999) by Watson and Star Wars Episode I Journal: Anakin Skywalker (1999) by Todd Strasser.

External links 

1998 novels
Star Wars Legends novels
American young adult novels
Children's science fiction novels